Juan Manuel Flores Arenas (born September 7, 1993, in Romita, Guanajuato) is a Mexican professional football player who plays for Club León Premier.

External links
 

1993 births
Living people
Footballers from Guanajuato
Mexican footballers
Liga MX players
Association footballers not categorized by position
21st-century Mexican people